Ramana Gogula (born Gogula Ramana Murthy) is an Indo-American music composer and singer of film music and Indian pop, entrepreneur, and venture capitalist. His notable film compositions include Premante Idera (1998), Thammudu (1999), Badri (2000), Johnny (2003), Lakshmi (2006), Annavaram (2006), Yogi (2007). He is known for his collaborations with Pawan Kalyan with whom he worked for four films. 

He is currently the Vice President, Clean Technology Innovation at Stanley Black & Decker, Inc and a venture partner at Anthill Ventures.

Early life and career
In 1996, his band Misty Rhythms released the Indie Pop studio album Aye Laila along with a music video which became a chart buster on major music channels MTV and Channel [V] in India. He then ventured into Telugu cinema and composed songs and background score for around 25 films predominantly in Telugu with a few films in Kannada and Tamil languages. 

As an entrepreneur, Ramana Gogula founded startups like Liqwid Krystal in the education sector, and Earthen Glow that provides off-grid solar lighting to villages. He is also the Vice President, Clean Technology Innovation at Stanley Black & Decker, Inc and a venture partner at Anthill Ventures. He was also the managing director for South Asia for the MNC Sybase.

Film music

Original Score And Soundtracks

Studio albums

References

External links 
 

Living people
People from Vizianagaram
Singers from Andhra Pradesh
Indian rock singers
Indian male pop singers
Indian rock musicians
Telugu film score composers
Indian male singer-songwriters
Indian singer-songwriters
Indian male playback singers
Kannada film score composers
Telugu playback singers
Kannada playback singers
Film musicians from Andhra Pradesh
20th-century Indian singers
21st-century Indian singers
20th-century Indian composers
21st-century Indian composers
People from Visakhapatnam
People from Uttarandhra
Male film score composers
20th-century Indian male singers
21st-century Indian male singers
Year of birth missing (living people)